Billbergia seidelii is a plant species in the genus Billbergia. This species is endemic to Brazil.

References

seidelii
Flora of Brazil